Otto von Knobelsdorff (31 March 1886 – 21 October 1966) was a German general during World War II who led the 19th Panzer Division and then held a series of higher commands. He was a recipient of the Knight's Cross of the Iron Cross with Oak Leaves and Swords.

Biography
Born in Berlin in 1886 to a noble family, Knobelsdorff joined the army of Imperial Germany in 1905 as a Fahnen-junker (officer cadet) and served in the infantry. Twice awarded the Iron Cross during World War I, he later served in the Heer (Army) branch of the Wehrmacht. He was chief of staff of Corps Command XXXIII at the time of the outbreak of World War II. A generalmajor, he was given command of the 19th Infantry Division on 1 February 1940 and led it through the Battle of France and during subsequent occupation duty. In October, the division was withdrawn to Germany for conversion to armour. It was re-designated the 19th Panzer Division and Knobelsdorff, promoted to Generalleutnant in late 1940, oversaw his command's transition from infantry to tanks.

With Knobelsdorff still in command, the division was sent to Russia as part of Operation Barbarossa and fought through to the outskirts of Moscow. In early 1942, he was acting commander of X Army Corps and fulfilled the same role for II Army Corps in mid-1942, when it was involved in the Demyansk Salient. He then commanded XXIV Panzer Corps, still as acting commander, before being given a permanent role leading XXXXVIII Panzer Corps from late 1942 to late 1943, although he spent three months out of the lines during this time. Now a General der Panzertruppe (General of Panzer Troops), during this period he was awarded the Oak Leaves to the Knight's Cross of the Iron Cross that he had been awarded in 1941 while leading the 19th Panzer Division and the German Cross in gold.

Competent as a leader of armoured formations, Knobelsdorff was given command of 1st Army in September 1944, serving in France at the time. Although awarded the Swords to his Knight's Cross the same month, he proved less adept at this level and was ultimately relieved in November 1944 for resisting Adolf Hitler's efforts to transfer 1st Army's tanks away in support of the Ardennes offensive. He ended the war without another command. In later life, he wrote Geschichte der niedersaechsischen 19. Panzer-Division, a history of the 19th Panzer Division which was published in 1958. He died in Hannover in 1966.

Awards
 Iron Cross (1914) 2nd Class & 1st Class 
 Iron Cross (1939) 2nd Class & 1st Class
 German Cross in Gold on 16 February 1943 as General der Panzertruppe in the XXXXVIII Panzer Corps
 Knight's Cross of the Iron Cross on 17 September 1941 as Generalleutnant and commander of the 19th Panzer Division
 Knight's Cross of the Iron Cross with Oak Leaves on 12 November 1943 as General der Panzertruppe and commanding general of the XXXXVIII Panzer Corps
 Knight's Cross of the Iron Cross with Oak Leaves and Swords on 21 September 1944 as General der Panzertruppe and commanding general of the XXXX Panzer Corps

Notes
Footnotes

Citations

References

 
 
 

1886 births
1966 deaths
Military personnel from Berlin
People from the Province of Brandenburg
Generals of Panzer Troops
Recipients of the Gold German Cross
Recipients of the Knight's Cross of the Iron Cross with Oak Leaves and Swords

Recipients of the clasp to the Iron Cross, 1st class
German prisoners of war in World War II held by the United States
Reichswehr personnel
German Army personnel of World War I